Miguel Angel González (born 3 July 1944) is a Mexican sprinter. He competed in the men's 100 meters at the 1968 Summer Olympics.

References

External links
 

1944 births
Living people
Athletes (track and field) at the 1963 Pan American Games
Athletes (track and field) at the 1968 Summer Olympics
Mexican male sprinters
Olympic athletes of Mexico
Athletes from Mexico City
Pan American Games competitors for Mexico
20th-century Mexican people